Martin Kližan and David Marrero were the defending champions, but chose not to participate.
František Čermák and Lukáš Rosol won the title, defeating Dušan Lajović and Franko Škugor in the final, 6–4, 7–6(7–5).

Seeds

Draw

Draw

References
 Main Draw

ATP Vegeta Croatia Open - Doubles
2014 Doubles